The Garage is a Soviet 1979 comedy film directed by Eldar Ryazanov, based on a screenplay by Emil Braginsky.

Plot summary
A cooperative has been planning to build a new parking garage with assigned spots for its members. The process was painfully slow and bureaucratic, but at long last, it appeared that the plans had been finalized. However, the plans are thrown into disarray when the size of the garage must be reduced to make way for a new highway, and there won't be parking space for all the long-suffering members. The cooperative holds a special meeting to decide who will lose their spots. In fact, the decision was actually made by the cooperative's board before the meeting, and some members of the cooperative object to this unfair process. Their objections are ignored until, in desperation, a disgruntled member secretly locks the door to the meeting room and hides the key so that the meeting cannot end until a fair decision is made. The members then argue with each other back and forth until late at night...

Cast
 Liya Akhedzhakova as Malayeva
 Iya Savvina as Anikeyeva
Svetlana Nemolyaeva as Guskov's Wife
 Valentin Gaft as Sidorin, Head of Cooperative
 Andrey Myagkov as Khvostov
 Georgi Burkov as Vitaly Fetisov
 Leonid Markov as Professor Smirnovsky
Vyacheslav Nevinny as Karpukhin
 Anastasia Voznesenskaya as Market Director
 Semyon Farada as Trombone Player
 Igor Kostolevsky as Miloserdov's Son
 Olga Ostroumova as Marina
 Gleb Strizhenov as Yakubov
Boryslav Brondukov as The Groom
 Natalya Gurzo as Natasha

Source:

Production 
Director Eldar Ryazanov got the idea for the movie after a meeting for the parking garage co-operative of Mosfilm employees. The director expected the meeting to last only 30 minutes, but it instead lasted the whole day. He returned in a state of shock because of the way that the artists, including those with reputations as decent and intelligent people, behaved when they learned that some of them would have to give up their parking spots. Even members whose names were famousnot only in the country but also worldwideresorted to insults and verbal attacks to defend their parking spots. Afterwards, Ryazanov felt guilty because he did not stand up for those who lost their parking spots.

His alter ego in the film is Professor Smirnovsky, who sees the injustice of what is happening but does nothing about it.

As in all his movies, Eldar Ryazanov acted in a minor role: he played the head of the insect department who overslept the whole meeting and drew the unfortunate lot at the end of the film.

References

External links

 

1979 films
Mosfilm films
1979 comedy-drama films
1970s Russian-language films
Films directed by Eldar Ryazanov
Films shot in Moscow
Films shot in Saint Petersburg
Films set in Moscow
Films set in the Soviet Union
Soviet comedy-drama films
Russian comedy-drama films